Kevin Brown II (born October 18, 1993) is a retired professional gridiron football linebacker and inspirational speaker.

High School career

Lawrence Central High School 
Brown played high school football in Indianapolis, IN for the Lawrence Central Bears from 2010-2011.

College career

Cincinnati Bearcats 
Brown played college football for the Cincinnati Bearcats from 2012 to 2015.

Professional career

Ottawa Redblacks
Brown signed with the Ottawa Redblacks on December 1, 2016. He played in his first professional game on July 19, 2017, against the Montreal Alouettes where he recorded two special teams tackles. For the 2017 season, he played in 11 regular season games and had 15 defensive tackles, seven special teams tackles, and one sack. In 2018, he became a regular starter and played in 16 regular season games, starting in 15 of them, while recording 55 defensive tackles, 17 special teams tackles, two sacks, and an interception. He also played in his first Grey Cup game, where he had two defensive tackles, but the Redblacks lost the 106th Grey Cup to the Calgary Stampeders. In 2019, the Redblacks struggled to a 3–15 season and Brown played in 15 of those games where he had 42 defensive tackles, 13 special teams tackles, and one interception.

Brown re-signed with the Redblacks to a one-year contract extension on February 11, 2020, but the 2020 CFL season was cancelled and he did not play in 2020. He became a free agent on February 9, 2021.

Edmonton Elks
On February 9, 2021, Brown signed a one-year contract with the Edmonton Football Team. However, he was released by the newly named Edmonton Elks at the end of training camp on July 26, 2021.

Winnipeg Blue Bombers
It was announced on August 17, 2021, that Brown had agreed to sign to the practice roster of the Winnipeg Blue Bombers. He was soon elevated to the active roster and played in his first game with the Blue Bombers on August 21, 2021. He played in seven regular season games with the Blue Bombers in 2021 where he had two defensive tackles and eight special teams tackles. He became a free agent upon the expiry of his contract on February 8, 2022.

Retirement
Brown retired from the Canadian Football League in 2022.

Real Estate Development

Trent L. Garrett Fellowship 
After retiring from the Canadian Football League, Brown transitioned to working in residential development and became the first Trent L. Garrett fellow at Intend Indiana.

Black and White Investments (BWI) 
After completing the two-year fellowship program in just seven months, Brown was offered a position as a Financial Analyst with Gary Hobbs Sr. at BWI, a real estate development, construction and property management company headquartered in Indianapolis, IN.

Inspirational Speaking

Kevin Brown II, LLC 
Brown created Kevin Brown II, LLC as a platform to share his story through inspirational speaking.

Inspire Indiana 
Brown created Inspire Indiana and the Inspire Indiana Podcast as an initiative of Kevin Brown II, LLC with the mission being to motivate, educate and inspire the next generation of athletes, scholars and entrepreneurs in his hometown of Indianapolis, IN.

References

External links
Winnipeg Blue Bombers bio

1993 births
Living people
African-American players of American football
African-American players of Canadian football
American football linebackers
Canadian football linebackers
Cincinnati Bearcats football players
Edmonton Elks players
Ottawa Redblacks players
Players of American football from Indianapolis
Players of Canadian football from Indianapolis
Winnipeg Blue Bombers players
Motivational speakers